Vormsi, also Ormsö is the fourth-largest island of Estonia. It is part of Vormsi Parish, a rural municipality.

Etymology
Ormsö in Swedish means "Orm's Island", and can be translated also as "Snake Island". The island's Estonian name Vormsi is derived from its German name Worms or its Swedish name Ormsö.

History
Vormsi's history dates back as far as the 13th century.  During most of this time, the island was inhabited by Estonian Swedes ("rannarootslased" in Estonian or "coastal Swedes" in English), whose population reached 3,000 before World War II. During the war, nearly all of Vormsi's population, along with other Swedes living in Estonia, forming the larger region of Aiboland, were evacuated, or fled, to Sweden. The island's current registered population is about 400.

Villages
The villages on the island include: Hullo (the administrative center), Sviby (the main port), Söderby, Norrby, Diby, Rälby, Förby, Borrby, Kärrslätt, Saxby, Suuremõisa (Magnushof, formerly Busby), Rumpo (the main beach area) and Hosby.

Economy
Vormsi is the per capita wealthiest island and region in Estonia outside of the Tallinn metro area, with incomes on the same level as inner Tallinn. This is attributed to the fact that many comparatively wealthy people own summer homes on the island and are registered as residents, so their yearly income tax is forwarded to the island's budget.

Vormsi has no industrial activity. The island earns the majority of its revenues from the taxation of the mainland and overseas income of residents.

Residents
The island of Vormsi has homeowners from several countries and regions: Estonia, Sweden, Finland, Switzerland, Åland.

Literature
 Kanarbik, Madis, Ormsö. De estlandssvenska böndernas kamp mot godsägarna under 1700- och 1800-talet [Nordistica Tartuensia; 9] (Tartu, 2003)
 Beyer, Jürgen, 'Whom should one thank for a narrow escape? Lessons drawn from a perilous journey from Vormsi and Noarootsi to Finland in 1796', Pro Ethnologia 17 (2004), 175-95

Gallery

References

External links

 Vormsi vald (Vormsi municipality)

Estonian islands in the Baltic
Landforms of Lääne County
 Vormsi